FHF may refer to:

 Bifluoride
 Fachhochschule Flensburg, a vocational university in Flensburg, Germany
 Fachhochschule Furtwangen, now the Furtwangen University of Applied Sciences, in Germany
 Feast of Hate and Fear, a defunct fanzine
 FGF homologous factor
 The Fred Hollows Foundation, an Australian medical aid organization
 Friends of Hue Foundation, an American relief organization
 Fulminant hepatic failure
 Haitian Football Federation,